Foster Namwera (born 19 September 1986) is a retired Malawian football defender.

References

1986 births
Living people
Malawian footballers
Malawi international footballers
Mighty Wanderers FC players
Clube Ferroviário de Nampula players
Association football defenders
Malawian expatriate footballers
Expatriate footballers in Mozambique
Malawian expatriate sportspeople in Mozambique